Johannes Sikkar (October 15, 1897 – August 22, 1960) was the first head of the Estonian government in exile as Acting Prime Minister (January 12, 1953 – January 1, 1962).

Biography
Sikkar was born in Kõnnu, Tartu County. Sikkar served in the Estonian War of Independence against post-revolutionary Soviet Russia on armoured train as a voluntary and an officer, he was granted a farm, which he held until 1944. He finished economic faculty of Tartu University cum laude in 1936. In 1920 he married Hilda Vilhelmine Truus (1900–1995) and had a son and a daughter.

He was member of National Assembly from June 15, 1926 to December 31, 1937.

In 1940 and 1944 he participated in resistance against Soviet and German occupations and escaped to Sweden September 12, 1944.

There he was appointed and adjured minister by August Rei, 3rd Pater Estoniae on April 20, 1952, and Acting Prime Minister, as head of government in exile, and Minister of Interior on January 12, 1953. Because such political activities were then prohibited for Estonian exiles in Sweden, members of his government assumed their offices in Oslo, Norway.

He died in Stockholm, Sweden.

Johannes Sikkar's government
Johannes Sikkar (died August 22, 1960) – Acting Prime Minister and Minister of Interior
Aleksander Warma – Minister of Foreign Affairs
Tõnis Kint (from January 14, 1953) – Minister of Agriculture, from August 22, 1960 also Acting Prime Minister 
Mihkel Truusööt (January 14, 1953 – September 10, 1956) – Minister of Economic Affairs
Aksel Mark (from September 21, 1956) – Minister
Arvo Horm (from September 21, 1956) – Minister
Oskar Lõvi (from May 25, 1957) – Minister of Economic Affairs
Peeter Panksep (from May 25, 1957) – Minister

Sources
 Johannes Sikkar, Mihkel Truusööt, Tõnis Kint and Aleksander Warma were appointed on January 12, 1953. Dates given above are these, when they assumed their offices.
 Gustav Suits, who was appointed Minister of Public Education, assumed not this office and died on May 23, 1956.
 Oskar Lõvi, Peeter Panksep, Aksel Mark and Arvo Horm were appointed on September 10, 1956.
 Eduard Leetmaa was appointed Minister on January 31, 1959, but he assumed not this office.

1897 births
1960 deaths
People from Kastre Parish
People from the Governorate of Livonia
Settlers' Party politicians
Members of the Riigikogu, 1926–1929
Members of the Riigikogu, 1929–1932
Members of the Riigikogu, 1932–1934
University of Tartu alumni
Estonian World War II refugees
Estonian emigrants to Sweden
20th-century Estonian politicians